CarProof is a Canadian provider of vehicle history and valuation reports used by consumers and businesses when buying and selling pre-owned vehicles.

History
CarProof was created in 2000 and is based in London, Ontario. Paul Antony, the company's co-founder, recognized through his experience running a car dealership that no service existed for a cross-Canada lien search on used cars. He, along with a team of founders, created CarProof to provide Canadians who are buying or selling used cars with accurate details about a vehicle's history as well as lien information. CarProof has since added vehicle valuation solutions to its product line. The company's president is Mark Rousseau. In December 2015, CarProof was purchased by IHS Inc for 650 million. On November 1, 2018, CarProof officially became CARFAX Canada.

Product and services
CarProof offers two different vehicle history reports, which are available in French and English: CarProof Verified and CarProof Claims.

CarProof Verified is the most comprehensive report available in Canada. It includes: accident data, unfixed safety recalls, import and export data, registration and branding information, full U.S. history and lien information.

CarProof Claims is a good choice for consumers that already know the vehicle's lien information. This report does not include lien information but does include: accident data, unfixed safety recalls, import and export data, registration and branding info and full U.S. history.

PROOF Packs provide consumers the option to look into multiple vehicles with a single purchase. Consumers can run Claims reports on three vehicles, and when they decide they're serious about one of them, they can run a lien check to make sure it's a good buy.

CarProof's Vehicle Valuation Report provides Canadian dealers with valuation information that is based on what comparable vehicles sold for, as opposed to their listing prices which is how most valuation products are structured.

Partners
In addition to being used by consumers, CarProof is also a resource for Canadian car dealers, major car manufacturers, lenders and insurers, provincial governments, auto auctions, law enforcement agencies and the Canadian Automobile Association.

Awards

See also
 Used car
 Vehicle identification number
 Vehicle history report
 Car dealership
 Car auction

References

External links
 

Canadian companies established in 2000
Service companies of Canada
Automotive industry in Canada
Companies based in London, Ontario
2000 establishments in Ontario
Used car market